Duncombe may refer to:

People
 Anthony Duncombe, 1st Baron Feversham (c.1695–1763), British landowner and politician 
 Anthony Duncombe (died 1708), English politician
 Arthur Duncombe (Royal Navy officer) (1806–1889), Royal Navy admiral and Member of Parliament
 Arthur Duncombe (1840–1911), British politician
 Augustus Duncombe (1814–1880), Church of England priest, Dean of York
 Charles Duncombe (disambiguation), several people
 David Duncombe (1802–1887), Canadian physician and politician
 Francis Duncombe (c.1653–1720), English politician
 A. Jane Duncombe (1925–2015), Canadian architect
 Jasper Duncombe, 7th Baron Feversham (born 1968), British adult film producer
 John Duncombe (Bury St Edmunds MP) (1622–1687), English politician
 John Duncombe (writer) (1729–1786), English clergyman and writer
 Julena Steinheider Duncombe (1911–2003), American mathematics teacher and astronomer
 L. C. R. Duncombe-Jewell (1866–1947), British soldier, special war correspondent of The Times and Morning Post, sportsman and sometimes poet
 Nick Duncombe (1982–2003), English rugby union footballer
 Octavius Duncombe (1817–1879), British politician
 Peter Duncombe, 6th Baron Feversham (1945–2009), British writer
 Susanna Duncombe (1725–1812), English poet and artist
 Thomas Duncombe (died 1746) (c.1683–1746), British Member of Parliament
 Thomas Duncombe (died 1779) (1724–1779), British Member of Parliament
 Thomas Slingsby Duncombe (1796–1861), British MP
 William Duncombe (disambiguation), several people
 Baron Feversham, British title held by persons with surname Duncombe
 Duncombe baronets, two baronetcies created for persons with surname Duncombe

Places
 3368 Duncombe, a minor planet
 Duncombe, Iowa, United States
 Duncombe, Lancashire, England
 Duncombe Creek (Uwharrie River tributary), Montgomery County, North Carolina
 Duncombe Park, the seat of the Duncombe family, Helmsley, North Yorkshire